Geffen (lit. Grapevine) is a Hebrew surname. Notable people with the surname include:

Aviv Geffen (born 1973), Israeli rock singer
David Geffen (born 1943), American record executive, film producer and theatrical producer
Jeremy Geffen (1977–2018), American entrepreneur and entertainment executive
Maxwell M. Geffen (1896–1980), American editor and publisher from New York 
Shira Geffen (born 1971), Israeli actress, screenwriter and film director
Tobias Geffen (1870–1970), American rabbi from Atlanta, Georgia
Yehonatan Geffen (born 1947), Israeli writer

Hebrew-language surnames